The 1983 World Sambo Championships were held in Kiev, Soviet Union in September/October 1983. Championships were organized by FILA.

Medal overview

External links 
Results on Sambo.net.ua

World Sambo Championships
1983 in Ukrainian sport
1983 in Soviet sport
Sports competitions in Kyiv
International sports competitions hosted by Ukraine
International sports competitions hosted by the Soviet Union
1980s in Kyiv
1983 in sambo (martial art)
Martial arts in the Soviet Union